The United Presbyterian Church of Shedd (also known as Valley Rose Chapel) is a historic Presbyterian church at 30045 OR 99 East in Shedd, Oregon.  It was built in 1892 in a Gothic Revival style and was added to the National Register of Historic Places (NRHP) in 1998.

Its NRHP nomination argued it to be "a graceful, wood-frame Gothic Revival church, bestowed with a substantive role in local history", being located just a few miles from the Linn County location of the first United Presbyterian Church "in the entire world" to be formed.  And this Shedd church drew from those congregations.

References

Presbyterian churches in Oregon
Churches on the National Register of Historic Places in Oregon
Carpenter Gothic church buildings in Oregon
Churches completed in 1892
Buildings and structures in Linn County, Oregon
National Register of Historic Places in Linn County, Oregon